The Hotel Unique is a hotel located in the district of Jardins in the  Brazilian city of São Paulo, established in 2002. Its shape was compared to a boat or a watermelon.

The hotel houses 95 apartments, 10 of which are suites, and on its terrace is the restaurant Skye.

Gallery

References

External links 
Official website 

Hotels in Brazil
2002 establishments in Brazil
Tourism in São Paulo